New Barnet Methodist Chapel was a Methodist chapel that once existed on the corner of Station Road and Lyonsdown Road in New Barnet, London.

History
The chapel opened in 1880 and replaced a temporary building elsewhere. Some £4,000 was raised for its construction, with an additional £3,000 contribution from the Methodist Chapel Building Fund, making the newly established suburb of New Barnet one of the better off circuits and contrasting with poorer areas that struggled to raise the necessary monies for chapel building. It was demolished in 1963 and replaced with an office building known as Kingmaker House.

The minister in the 1940s was Frederick Howell Everson, a Methodist author and former journalist.

References 

Former churches in London
New Barnet
Methodist churches in London
Churches in the London Borough of Barnet
Demolished churches in London
Churches completed in 1880
Buildings and structures demolished in 1963